Lukáš Heřmanský (born 24 August 1980) is a Czech skier. He competed in the Nordic combined team event at the 2002 Winter Olympics.

References

1980 births
Living people
Czech male Nordic combined skiers
Olympic Nordic combined skiers of the Czech Republic
Nordic combined skiers at the 2002 Winter Olympics
People from Myjava
Sportspeople from the Trenčín Region